The  was a Japanese domain of the Edo period, located in Musashi Province. It was centered on what is now the city of Kawaguchi in Saitama Prefecture.

References
 Japanese Wiki article on Hatogaya

Further reading
Bolitho, Harold (1974). Treasures among men; the fudai daimyo in Tokugawa Japan. New Haven: Yale University Press.
Kodama Kōta 児玉幸多, Kitajima Masamoto 北島正元 (1966). Kantō no shohan 関東の諸藩. Tokyo: Shin Jinbutsu Ōraisha.

Domains of Japan